Maurizio Venturi (born October 2, 1957, in Brescia) is an Italian former footballer who played as a defender. He played for two seasons (43 games without scoring) in Serie A for Brescia and A.C. Milan, and made a further 229 appearances in the Italian professional leagues.

References

1957 births
Living people
Italian footballers
Association football defenders
Brescia Calcio players
A.C. Milan players
Palermo F.C. players
Cagliari Calcio players
Serie A players
Serie B players
Italian football managers